Volta Charging is an American electric vehicle infrastructure company. Volta charging stations are compatible with all major plug-in hybrid and battery electric vehicle types in the United States and have a digital screen featuring advertisements. Generally, charging a vehicle at a Volta station is free, because Volta is supported by advertisements. As of September 2021, the company had installed more than 2,000 charging stations in twenty-three U.S. states.

History
Volta Charging was founded in Hawaii in 2010 by Scott Mercer and Chris Wendel. Leonardo DiCaprio was an early investor in the company.

In February 2021, Volta announced a special-purpose acquisition company merger with Tortoise Acquisition Company II. After completing the merger, Volta went public on the New York Stock Exchange on August 27, 2021. By September 2021, the company had installed more than 2,000 charging stations in twenty-three U.S. states. In November 2021, Volta partnered with Topgolf to install charging stations at Topgolf entertainment centers across the United States. In the third financial quarter of 2021, Volta's revenues increased 77 percent year-over-year to $8.5 million.

See also
Charging station
Plug-in vehicle
Plug-in hybrid vehicle

References

External links
 

Electric vehicle infrastructure developers
American companies established in 2010
Special-purpose acquisition companies
Electronics companies established in 2010
Companies listed on the New York Stock Exchange
Companies based in San Francisco
2010 establishments in Hawaii